Friendship College was a college in Rock Hill, South Carolina that was established in 1891. One basketball player from the school, Harthorne Wingo, played in the NBA and was an NBA Finals champion. The school was closed permanently in 1981, and demolished after a fire.

Sports
Friendship college had teams in baseball, football, and basketball. They lost 106–0 to Florida Normal in 1947, and 142–0 to Edward Waters in 1964.

See also
Friendship Nine

References 

1891 establishments in South Carolina
1981 disestablishments in South Carolina
Educational institutions established in 1891
Educational institutions disestablished in 1981
Rock Hill, South Carolina
Defunct private universities and colleges in South Carolina